Université Franco-Haïtienne du Cap-Haïtien (UFCH) is an academic institution in Haiti that offers courses in arts, humanities and social sciences. It is the first university offering distance learning courses.

Currently it offers undergraduate and graduate levels programs. It has a university cooperation agreement with the Paul Valéry University, Montpellier III in France.  The rector is Dr. Wander Numa.

See also
France–Haiti relations

References

External links
Université Franco-Haïtienne du Cap-Haïtien (official site)

Universities in Haiti
Buildings and structures in Cap-Haïtien
2011 establishments in Haiti
Educational institutions established in 2011